Lauris Norstad (March 24, 1907 – September 12, 1988) was an American general officer in the United States Army and United States Air Force.

Early life and military career
Lauris Norstad was born in Minneapolis, Minnesota to a Norwegian immigrant Lutheran minister and his wife. He earned his high school diploma from Red Wing Central High School in 1925. He graduated from the United States Military Academy June 12, 1930 and was commissioned a second lieutenant in the Army as a cavalry officer. In September 1930, he entered Primary Flying School at March Field, California, and graduated from Advanced Flying School and was transferred to the Air Corps in June 1931. Going to Schofield Barracks, Hawaii, in January 1932, he was assigned to the 18th Pursuit Group, assuming command of it in July 1933. In March 1936 he was named adjutant of the Ninth Bomb Group there. Entering the "short course" the Air Corps Tactical School at Maxwell Field, Alabama, in September 1939, he graduated three months later and returned to Mitchel Field as officer in charge of the 9th Bomb Group Navigation School.

Moving to Langley Field, Virginia, in July 1940, Norstad was adjutant of the 25th Bomb Group, and the following November he was named assistant chief of staff for intelligence of General Headquarters Air Force there. In February 1942 he was appointed a member of the Advisory Council to the commanding general of the Army Air Forces at Washington, DC.

World War II

In August 1942, Norstad was named assistant chief of staff for operations (A-3) of the Twelfth Air Force, going to England with it the following month in support of Operation Husky, and to Algiers, North Africa in October 1942. Here he met General Dwight Eisenhower, who said of him: "It was on that occasion that I first met Lieutenant Colonel Lauris Norstad, a young air officer who so impressed me by his alertness, grasp of problems, and personality that I never thereafter lost sight of him. He was and is one of those rare men whose capacity knows no limit." During his time in North Africa, future atomic strike commander Paul Tibbets was briefly on his staff.  In his autobiography, Tibbets claimed that he embarrassed Norstad in a strike planning meeting by being critical of his decision to bomb a target at low altitude, (offering to lead it himself at 6000 feet if Norstad would fly with him as co pilot) and Norstad was in the process of having him court-martialled before Gen Jimmy Doolittle got Tibbets transferred back to the states before Norstad could sink his career.  Tibbets also claimed that Norstad was a "social climber" and political animal in the Air Force and that he aligned himself tightly with Hoyt Vandenberg and followed him up the chain of command. 

In February 1943, he was promoted to brigadier general and assumed the additional duty of assistant chief of staff for operations of the Northwest African Air Forces. In December 1943 he was appointed director of operations of the Mediterranean Allied Air Forces at Algiers, moving with it to Caserta, Italy, two months later.

Norstad was transferred to Washington, D.C. in August 1944, where he was deputy chief of Air Staff at Army Air Force Headquarters with added duty as chief of staff of the 20th Air Force. He was relieved of this additional duty May 8, 1945, and assumed additional duty as assistant chief of Air Staff for Plans at Army Air Force Headquarters. He was promoted to major general the following month.
Relieved of assignment as chief of staff of the 20th Air Force in February 1946, he continued as assistant chief of air staff for plans until the following June, when he was appointed director of the Plans and Operations Division of the War Department at Washington, DC.

On October 1, 1947, following the division of the War Department into the Departments of The Army and The Air Force, General Norstad transferred to the Air Force and was appointed deputy chief of staff for operations of the Air Force, and the following May assumed additional duty as acting vice chief of staff of the Air Force.

SHAPE leadership

Joining the U.S. Air Forces in Europe in October 1950 General Norstad was commander in chief, U.S. Air Forces in Europe, with headquarters at Wiesbaden, Germany. On April 2, 1951 he assumed additional duty as commanding general of the Allied Air Forces in Central Europe under the Supreme Headquarters of the Allied Powers in Europe. He was designated air deputy to the Supreme Allied Commander Europe, on July 27, 1953.

After serving as air deputy to the Supreme Allied Commander, Europe (SACEUR) on November 20, 1956, Norstad was appointed as Supreme Allied Commander Europe, and commander in chief of U.S. European Command. He served in the top post for European Command November 1, 1962 and as SACEUR until December 31, 1962 when General Lyman Lemnitzer replaced him. Norstad initially encouraged France to develop its own nuclear capacity, but then abandoned the idea once he grew disillusioned with French President Charles de Gaulle's interference with NATO.

Later years
General Norstad retired from the USAF on January 2, 1963. After his military retirement, he became the Chief Executive Officer and President of Owens Corning from 1963 until 1972 and also served on the Board of Directors of Rand Corporation. Norstad was critical of the Vietnam War, and in 1967 proposed a halt to the bombing  of North Vietnam, a unilateral ceasefire, and an end to American reinforcements sent to South Vietnam, followed by a summit to negotiate a treaty. He died on September 12, 1988, and was buried at Arlington National Cemetery, in Arlington, Virginia.

Awards and decorations

General Norstad's military awards included the following:

Effective dates of promotions

See also
 List of commanders of USAFE

References

Further reading
 Jordan, Robert S. Norstad: Cold War NATO Supreme CommanderAirman, Strategist, Diplomat St. Martin's Press, 2000. 350 pp.

External links

 Papers of Lauris Norstad, Dwight D. Eisenhower Presidential Library
 General Lauris Norstad, USAF Biography

|-

|-

1907 births
1988 deaths
United States Army Cavalry Branch personnel
United States Military Academy alumni
Burials at Arlington National Cemetery
United States Air Force generals
American people of Norwegian descent
Recipients of the Distinguished Service Medal (US Army)
Recipients of the Silver Star
Recipients of the Legion of Merit
Recipients of the Legion of Honour
Recipients of the Croix de Guerre (France)
NATO Supreme Allied Commanders
Military personnel from Minneapolis
United States Army Air Forces generals
Recipients of the Air Medal
Recipients of the Air Force Distinguished Service Medal
United States Army Air Forces generals of World War II